Taiyuan is an elevated railway station on the TRA Taichung line located in Beitun District, Taichung, Taiwan.

Taiyuan Station was rebuilt with an elevated platform in 2016.

Platform Layout

Service
The TRA once operated a restaurant on the second floor at old Taiyuan Station, while Giant Bicycles also operated a store. Both are closed already prior to replaced by the elevated station.

Around the station
 Central Taiwan University of Science and Technology
 Taichung Military Kindred Village Museum
 Yide Mansion

See also
 List of railway stations in Taiwan

References

2002 establishments in Taiwan
Railway stations in Taichung
Railway stations opened in 2002
Railway stations served by Taiwan Railways Administration